The 2012–13 Lithuanian Hockey League season was the 22nd season of the Lithuanian Hockey League, the top level of ice hockey in Lithuania. Four teams participated in the league, and SC Energija won the championship.

Regular season

Playoffs

Semifinals
 SC Energija - Vanvita Vilnius 10:1
 Kėdainių LRK - Delovaja Rus Kaliningrad 2:5

3rd place game
 Kėdainių LRK - Vanvita Vilnius 3:5

Final
 SC Energija - Delovaja Rus Kaliningrad 3:1

External links
 Season on eurohockey.com

Lit
Lithuania Hockey League seasons
2012–13 in Lithuanian ice hockey